The  were a class of twelve destroyers of the Imperial Japanese Navy. All were given traditional poetic names of the months of the year by the  Lunar calendar or phases of the moon.

Background
With the imposition of the Washington Naval Treaty limiting the number and size of capital warships, increased emphasis was placed by the Imperial Japanese Navy on the quantity and firepower of its destroyer fleet to counter what was perceived to be the growing threat from the United States Navy. The Mutsuki-class destroyers were an improved version of the Kamikaze class destroyers and were ordered under the 1923 fiscal budget.

Along with the Minekaze and Kamikaze classes, the Mutsuki-class ships formed the backbone of Japanese destroyer formations throughout the twenties and thirties. The Minekaze and Kamikaze classes were withdrawn from front line service and reassigned to secondary duties towards the end of the 1930s, but the Mutsukis were retained as first line destroyers due to their range and their more powerful torpedo armament.  All saw combat during World War II, and none survived the war.

Initially, the Mutsuki-class ships had only hull numbers due to the projected large number of warships the Japanese navy expected to build through the Eight-eight fleet plan. This proved to be extremely unpopular with the crews and was a constant source of confusion in communications. In August 1928, names were assigned.

Design

The Mutsuki-class destroyers were based on the same hull design as the previous Kamikaze class, except with a double curvature configuration of the bow, a feature to improve seaworthiness which became a standard in all later Japanese destroyers.

After the Fourth Fleet Incident of September 1935, during which many ships in the Imperial Japanese Navy were damaged by a typhoon while on training exercises, weaknesses in the Mutsuki-class were addressed by retrofitting with a strengthened, more compact, bridge, with raked smokestacks, and with redesigned watertight shields on the torpedo mounts. With these new shields torpedoes could be worked in all weather conditions, thus extending the useful life of the class.
 
In 1942,  had a boiler removed and her aft stack was reduced in size – she was the only ship of the class so modified.  had a similar reduction to her forward funnel; again, she was the only ship of the class so adapted. Between September 1942 and December 1943,  had her stern modified to facilitate the launching and recovery of landing barges. She was the only ship of the class to be modified as a destroyer transport.

Armament
The  Mutsuki-class destroyers were built with the same main battery as the Kamikaze-class, consisting of four Type 3 120 mm 45 caliber naval guns in single open mounts, exposed to the weather except for a small shield. These were located one forward, one aft, and two amidships, and two Type 92 7.7 mm anti-aircraft machine guns, one on either side of the bridge. However, the main difference from the Kamikaze was the use of two triple  torpedo tubes instead of the previous three double launchers. The newly developed Type 8 torpedoes had greater range and larger warhead than previous torpedoes in the Japanese inventory, but were soon superseded by the famous Type 93 "Long Lance" oxygen-propelled torpedoes during World War II. Also, for the first time on a Japanese destroyer, a reload was carried for each tube. The Mutsuki-class was also equipped with two Type 81 depth charge launchers in the stern, with a total of 18 depth charges.

After the start of the Pacific War, anti-aircraft capabilities were enhanced at the expense of surface warfare capabilities and speed. However, there was no standard modification for the class during the war. Some ships immediately received Type 93 13 mm AA Guns  mounted in front of the bridge and abaft the aft stack. From 1941 to 1942, many ships lost one or two of their aft guns in favor of up to ten Type 96 25mm AA Guns.

Of the surviving members of the class in 1943, four had their aft bank of torpedo tubes removed to reduce weight and to permit storage of cargo. The three ships that survived into late 1944 (and ), had their suite of anti-aircraft guns increased to 16 and 22 Type 96 guns in single and dual mounts. Satsuki was fitted with a Type 13 radar in February 1944.

Operational history
The Mutsuki class formed the 5th and 6th Destroyer Squadrons.  Mutsuki and Kisaragi participated in the Battle of Wake Island at the start of the war, during which time Kisaragi was lost due to aircraft bombardment. The remaining eleven vessels participated in the invasions of the Philippines and Netherlands East Indies. In the subsequent Solomon Islands campaign surviving ships were exposed to considerable danger  as fast transports in “Tokyo Express” missions in trying to re-supply island garrisons. Mutsuki, Nagatsuki, Kikuzuki, Mikazuki and Mochizuki were lost due to air attack in various battles in the Solomons.

Surviving vessels participated in the New Guinea campaign, mostly in the role of “Tokyo Express” transports. Yayoi was lost in an air attack off New Guinea and Fumizuki in Operation Hailstone at Truk. In the final stages of the war, Uzuki was lost to US PT-boats, Satsuki and Yūzuki to air attacks and Minazuki to submarine torpedoes in the Philippines.

None of the Mutsuki-class destroyers survived the war.

List of ships

References

Notes

Books

External links

Destroyer classes
 
World War II destroyers of Japan